Nyakisi Adero (born 2 July 1986) is a Ugandan long distance runner. Adero stopped competing in 2011-12 after giving birth and returned to track in May 2012. She ran her first official marathon in October 2015, at the Amsterdam Marathon. She set a new Ugandan record at 2:34:54 and qualified for the 2016 Olympics. She placed 68th at the Rio Olympics.

References

External links

 

1986 births
Living people
Ugandan female long-distance runners
Ugandan female marathon runners
Place of birth missing (living people)
Athletes (track and field) at the 2016 Summer Olympics
Olympic athletes of Uganda
20th-century Ugandan women
21st-century Ugandan women